Pambansang Almusal is a Philippine television news broadcasting and talk show broadcast by Net 25. Originally hosted by Mavic Trinidad, Gen Subardiaga and Eden Suarez-Santos, it premiered on October 24, 2011 on the network's morning line up. Phoebe Publico, Kristel Fesalbon, Wej Cudiamat, and Apple David will serve as the final hosts. The show concluded on August 27, 2021. It was replaced by Kada Umaga in its timeslot.

Final Hosts

 Phoebe Publico 
 Kristel Fesalbon 
 Wej Cudiamat 
 Apple David

Former Hosts
 Mavic Trinidad
 Eden Suarez-Santos
 Gen Subardiaga
 Sophia Okut
 Gel Miranda
 Onin Miranda
 Davey Langit
 Aikee
 Apple Chiu
 Regine Angeles
 Richard Quan
 Carmela Magtuto-Navarro
 Kath Magtuto-Mangahas
 Bobby Crisostomo
 Tristan Bayani
 Nathan Manzo
 Chadleen Lacdo-o
 MJ Racadio
 Nikki Facal
 Nikki Veron-Cruz
 Kyle Nofuente
 Nicole Ching
 Leo Martinez
 Andrea Bardos
 Ben Bernaldez
 Liza Flores
 Mia Suarez
 Claire Cuenca
 Julie Fernando
 Cess Alvarez
 Ken Mesina
 Earlo Bringas
 Genesis Gomez
 Marie Ochoa
 Andrea Mendres
 Aily Millo
 CJ Panulaya
 Jam Talaña
 Genive Tuban
 Edward Flores
 Gerald Rañez
 Aaron Dy
 Mikki Sachico
 Mondi Lopez
 Anatha Eniego

See also
List of programs previously broadcast by Net 25

References

Philippine television news shows
2011 Philippine television series debuts
2021 Philippine television series endings
Breakfast television in the Philippines
Filipino-language television shows
Net 25 original programming